The Ifad Film Club Award is presented by Bangladesh Film Club to honour performances in different sectors of films. The official sponsor of the award is Ifad Group and the media partner is NTV.

History
The Ifad Film Club Award 2012 was the first and last. As of 2015, only one awards presentation made. The ceremony was held on 7 July 2013 at Bangabandhu International Conference Centre, Dhaka. No awards were made in 2014.

Awards
 Best Film
 Best Film Director
 Best Actor
 Best Actress
 Best Supporting Actor
 Best Supporting Actress
 Best Villain (Film)
 Best Music Director 
 Best Lyricist
 Best Playback Singer (Male)
 Best Playback Singer (Female)
 Lifetime Achievement
 Special award

2012

See also
National Film Awards (Bangladesh)
Meril Prothom Alo Awards
Babisas Award
Channel i Music Awards

References

Bangladeshi film awards